Louis Smallwood (1896 – death date unknown) was an American Negro league second baseman in the 1920s.

Smallwood played for the Milwaukee Bears in 1923. In 34 recorded games, he posted 23 hits and four RBI in 125 plate appearances.

References

External links
 and Seamheads

1896 births
Date of birth missing
Place of birth missing
Year of death missing
Place of death missing
Milwaukee Bears players